America was a steam cargo ship built in 1914 by the Sørlandets Skibsbyggeri of Fevig for the Norge Mexico Gulf Linjen. She was ordered by the line before being acquired by Wilhelm Wilhelmsen.

Design and Construction
In 1913 an English firm Fearnley & Eger and Wilhelm Wilhelmsen established the "Norwegian Africa and Australia Line" (NAAL). At about the same time the two companies also took over the "Norge Mexico Gulf Linjen" (NMGL) involved in oil and oil products transportation to South America. NMGL ordered a new ship in 1913 before the acquisition, and America was completed for Wilhelm Wilhelmson for NOK 1,297,000.57 next year. The ship was laid down in 1913 at Sørlandets Skibsbyggeri shipyard in Fevig, launched on 3 September 1914 (yard number 169) and commissioned in October of the same year. America was assessed at 3,706 GRT,  and 5,800 DWT.

Operational history
After completion America was put on the Norway-USA route connecting the East Coast ports of Boston and Philadelphia with Bergen and Kristiania.

The vessel loaded up cargo, which included among other things granite, at Stavanger and then Bergen and departed for her maiden voyage on November 3, 1914 for Havana via Boston and other ports. The ship arrived at Boston on November 21 and departed the next day for Philadelphia where she arrived two days later. From Philadelphia America continued on her journey, called at Newport News on November 28 before proceeding to Havana the next day. America arrived in Havana on December 4, unloaded her cargo and departed Cuba on December 11 for Galveston which she reached two days later. After taking on cargo, the ship departed for Kristiania via Gulf ports and Newport News and arrived at her destination on January 29, 1915.

America departed for her next and final voyage from Kristiania to Boston on February 25, 1915. She carried about 7,000 bales of cellulose, 1,400 bales of tree pulp, 1,800 boxes of canned goods and was not fully loaded. The ship arrived at Boston on March 13, and after unloading left Boston on March 19 for Philadelphia, arriving there three days later.

Sinking
America departed from Philadelphia on 28 March 1915 for her final voyage to Bergen with approximately 5,000 tons of general cargo. She had to stop at Kirkwall for inspection by the British authorities and spent 4 days there, departing 16 April 1915 to Sunderland. Upon arrival there next day, she had to unload part of her cargo including oil, leather and food supplies deemed to be contraband by the British. She left from Sunderland on 1 May 1915 with only 1,500 tons of cargo. The vessel quickly filled up with water, forcing her Captain Johan Endresen to order the crew to abandon ship. Three lifeboats were lowered and all 37 crew left the ship. America sank stern first at about 00:50 on May 2 in an approximate position . The torpedo was launched by the German submarine .

Notes

References

1914 ships
Merchant ships of Norway
Steamships of Norway
World War I merchant ships of Norway
Maritime incidents in 1915
Ships sunk by German submarines in World War I
World War I shipwrecks in the North Sea